Leo O'Brien (November 12, 1970 – October 10, 2012) was an American television and film actor, best known as Richie Green in the  1985 film The Last Dragon.

O'Brien was raised in Englewood, NJ, the younger brother of Guy O'Brien, better known as Master Gee of the pioneering rap group, The Sugarhill Gang.

Death
Leo O'Brien died on October 10, 2012, at age 41. The cause of death was never reported.

Filmography
Chiefs (1983) as Joshua Cole
The Last Dragon (1985) as Richie Green
Rappin' (1985) as Allan
New Jack City (1991) as Kid on Stoop

References

External links

1970 births
2012 deaths
Male actors from New York City
American male film actors